Whipped Cream can refer to:

 Whipped cream, food
 Whipped Cream (band), Swedish rock band formed in 1989
 "Whipped Cream" (song), a 1965 instrumental by Herb Alpert & the Tijuana Brass
 Schlagobers, 1924 ballet by Richard Strauss
 "Whipped Cream", a song on Ari Lennox's album Shea Butter Baby
 Whipped Cream (DJ), Canadian DJ and record producer